Cath Crowley is a young adult fiction author based in Melbourne, Australia. She has been shortlisted and received numerous literary awards including the 2011 Prime Minister's Literary Award for Young Adult Fiction for her novel Graffiti Moon and, in 2017, the Griffith University Young Adult Book Award at the Queensland Literary Awards for Words in Deep Blue.

Crowley was born in 1971 in rural Victoria. Her books include The Gracie Faltrain Trilogy, Chasing Charlie Duskin and Graffiti Moon. She is currently a freelance writer and part time teacher. Her work has been published in Australia and internationally.

Early life and career
Crowley grew up with three siblings and a dog called Elvis. She took courses in radio production and literature at university and then worked as an English teacher for some time.

She hadn't always wanted to be a writer but was later convinced while traveling in Europe. She often wrote letters home to her brother who created a musical, Journey Girl, inspired by these letters.

After returning from Europe, Crowley studied professional writing and editing at RMIT. She went on to write articles for newspapers and magazines and began her first novel, The Life and Times of Gracie Faltrain.

Crowley's most recent novel, Words in Deep Blue is a story of love, loss and the power of words. Her writing got a kick-start while she was grieving for her father, "I realised grief is very particular to each person," she said. Crowley now runs student writing workshops and freelance writes.

Novels 
 The Life and Times of Gracie Faltrain (2004)
 Chasing Charlie Duskin (2005)
 Gracie Faltrain Takes Control (2006)
 Gracie Faltrain Gets It Right (Finally) (2008)
 A Little Wanting Song (2010)
 Graffiti Moon (2010)
 A Little Wanting Song (2010)
 Rosie Staples' Minor Magical Misunderstanding (2010)
 
 Take Three Girls (2017) (written collaboratively with Fiona Wood and Simmone Howell)

Awards

Graffiti Moon 

 Winner for NSW Premier's Literary Awards Ethel Turner Prize 2011
 Winner for Prime Minister's Literary Award for Young Adult Fiction 2011
 Winner for APA Book Design Awards Best Designed Young Adult Book 2011
 Short-listed for CBCA Book of the Year for Older Readers 2011
 Short-listed for Victorian Premier's Literary Awards Prize for Writing for Young Adults 2011
 Short-listed for Queensland Premier's Literary Awards Young Adult Book Award 2011

Words in Deep Blue 

 Winner, Griffith University Young Adult Book Award, Queensland Literary Awards 2017
 Winner for Gold Inky Award 2017 
 Short-listed for Indie Book Awards Young Adult 2017
 Long-listed for CBCA Book of the Year for Older Readers 2017 
 Winner for Prime Minister's Literary Award for Young Adult Fiction 2017

Chasing Charlie Duskin 

 Short-listed for the CBCA’s prestigious Book of the Year

References 

Australian women novelists
Living people
1971 births
Writers from Melbourne
Australian writers of young adult literature